Lordegan County is in Chaharmahal and Bakhtiari province, Iran. The capital of the county is the city of Lordegan. At the 2006 census, the county's population was 175,289, in 34,603 households. The following census in 2011 counted 194,783 people in 44,921 households. At the 2016 census, the county's population was 209,681 in 54,825 households. After the census, Khanmirza District was separated from the county to participate in the formation of Khanmirza County, and Falard District to become Falard County.

Administrative divisions

The population history and structural changes of Lordegan County's administrative divisions over three consecutive censuses are shown in the following table. The latest census shows five districts, 11 rural districts, and five cities.

Demographics
Bakhtiari tribes are predominant inhabitants of Lordegan county. People mainly speak Lurish language by Bakhtiari dialect, which is a member of Southwestern Iranian languages.

Geography 
The Milas Plain (also Romanized as Mīlās) is found in Lordegan County. Wheat, rice and barley are cultivated in the plain.

References

 

Counties of Chaharmahal and Bakhtiari Province